Steffi Graf defeated Mary Joe Fernández in the final, 4–6, 6–2, 6–4 to win the women's singles tennis title at the 1993 French Open. With the win, Graf recaptured the world No. 1 ranking. It was Fernández' third and last appearance in a major singles final.

Monica Seles was the three-time reigning champion, but was unable to compete due to being stabbed the previous month.

Seeds

Qualifying

Draw

Finals

Top half

Section 1

Section 2

Section 3

Section 4

Bottom half

Section 5

Section 6

Section 7

Section 8

External links
1993 French Open – Women's draws and results at the International Tennis Federation

Women's Singles
French Open by year – Women's singles
French Open - Women's Singles
1993 in women's tennis
1993 in French women's sport